Pouilly-Fuissé is an appellation (AOC) for white wine in the Mâconnais subregion of Burgundy in central France, located in the communes of Fuissé, Solutré-Pouilly, Vergisson and Chaintré. Pouilly-Fuissé has Chardonnay as the only grape variety.

Pouilly-Fuissé is the best-known part of Mâconnais. The AOC was created on September 11, 1936. It was granted premier cru designation in September 2020. There are currently 22 premier cru climats.  The area used to be known simply as "Pouilly,” but when the AOC laws were introduced, it was split into three: Pouilly-Fuissé, Pouilly-Loché and Pouilly-Vinzelles.

Style

Pouilly-Fuissé is a dry white wine made from Chardonnay grapes. It is pale and refreshing, often quite delicate, and often shows a clear oak influence. On average these wines sell for much less than the white wines of Côte de Beaune to the north.

Geography
West of Mâcon the land rises up to form Mont de Pouilly and other limestone hills, covered in the alkaline clay that best suits Chardonnay.  The villages of Vergisson, Solutré-Pouilly, Fuissé and Chaintré shelter at their feet.

Production

In 2008,  of vineyard area was in production within the Pouilly-Fuissé AOC, and 39,147 hectoliters of wine were produced, corresponding to 5.2 million bottles of wine.

AOC regulations
The AOC regulations only allow Chardonnay to be used. The allowed base yield is 50 hectolitre per hectare and the grapes must reach a maturity of at least 11.0 per cent potential alcohol.

Notable residents
The négociant Georges Duboeuf of the Beaujolais wine region grew up on a small vineyard in the region.

In popular culture

In Hogan's Heroes, Season 2, Episode 10, "A Tiger Hunt in Paris, Part 1," LeBeau recommends Pouilly-Fuisse '41 for lunch, describing it as "not a daring wine, but a safe wine."

The Facts of Life, Season 3, Episode 1, "Growing Pains", Blair brings back two bottles of Pouilly-Fuisse.

The Andy Griffith Show includes the wine 
in the Season 6, Episode 2,  called "Andy's Rival".

In the Season 5, Episode 6 of The Mary Tyler Moore Show entitled "I Love a Piano", Murray returns to work intoxicated after having had a long lunch with a divorcee. When Lou asks him what he has been imbibing, he replies, "Pouilly-Fuissé." Lou says, "Too bad [...] I've been a news man for thirty years. I've sobered up guys who were drunk on everything from Scotch to aftershave lotion. But never once in my life have I had to sober up anyone who was drunk on Pouilly-Fuissé. I don't know what to do. I don't know whether to give him black coffee or cheese!"

In the Season 6, Episode 10 of The Jeffersons entitled “Louise vs. Florence,” Pouilly-Fuissé is prominently referenced by several characters, including Harry Bentley (Paul Benedict), George Jefferson (Sherman Hemsley), and Mr. Van Morris (a guest-starring role played by Fred D. Scott).

In the Frasier episode "Three Dates and a Breakup: Part 2," Frasier Crane refers to a 1992 Pouilly-Fuissé as "the nectar of the Gods."

In the Season 5, Episode 1 of Frasier entitled “Frasier’s Imaginary Friend,” Dr. Frasier Crane (Kelsey Grammer) briefly mentions Pouilly-Fuissé when he makes a cell-phone call to an unseen character named Barnard, and says, “chill your finest bottle of Pouilly-Fuissé.”

In the Season 6, Episode 18 of Frasier entitled “Taps at the Montana,” Dr. Niles Crane (David Hyde Pierce) briefly mentions Pouilly-Fuissé when he says, “And then to top it all off, the Pouilly-Fuissé we ordered was a grave disappointment.”

Jimmy Buffet's song "Landfall" contains a reference: "Oh, I love the smell of fresh snapper fried light; What'd you say, Pouilly-Fuisse could round out the night."

The song "Intravino", by Daryl Hall & John Oates from their 1979 album X-Static, has the lyrics: "Six o'clock, gotta have Beaujolais. Eight o'clock, I open up the Pouilly-Fuissé."

Ernest Hemingway references Pouilly-Fuisse several times in A Moveable Feast. In a meeting with the poet Ernest Walsh, "at a restaurant that was the best and most expensive in the Boulevard St.-Michel quarter," the two dine on oysters "and a bottle of Pouilly Fuisse..." while discussing their mutual friends James Joyce and Ezra Pound.

Pouilly-Fuissé was legendary drinker Andre the Giant's favorite wine.

David Rossi mentions a 2008 bottle of Pouilly-Fuisse while talking to Derek Morgan on Criminal Minds Season 10 Episode 12 titled “Anonymous”.

In the 1970s film, The Boys in the Band, Michael (Kenneth Nelson) provides a bottle of Pouilly-Fuissé to his friend Harold (Leonard Frey) saying "Here's a bottle of Pouilly-Fuissé I bought especially for you kiddo" to which Harold replies, "Pussycat. All is forgiven. You can stay. No, you can stay but not all is forgiven. Cheers."

Other "Pouilly" wines
The wines of Pouilly-Fuissé should not be confused with the Sauvignon blanc-based wines of Pouilly-Fumé and the Chasselas-based Pouilly-sur-Loire, both from the area around Pouilly-sur-Loire in the Loire Valley.

Notes

Burgundy (historical region) AOCs